Gimont is a commune in the Gers department in southwestern France. It is the seat (capital) of the canton of Gimone-Arrats.

Geography 

The commune is bordered by seven other communes: Escornebœuf to the north, Monferran-Savès to the northeast, Giscaro to the east, Maurens to the southeast, Montiron to the south, Juilles to the west, and finally by Aubiet to the northwest.

Population

International relations
Gimont is twinned with Enniscorthy in Ireland.

See also
Communes of the Gers department

References

Communes of Gers